Harry Edvin "Harri" Larva (born Lagerström, 9 September 1906 – 15 November 1980) was a Finnish athlete who won the 1500 m race at the 1928 Summer Olympics. He never excelled in this event nationally and was the Finnish champion in the 800 m in 1928–1930 and 1934. Larva finished 10th in the 1500 m at the 1932 Summer Olympics.

Larva was requested to change his last name in 1928 by Urho Kekkonen, then president of Finnish Athletics Union and later president of Finland, who thought that his birth name Lagerström did not sound Finnish enough.

References
 

1906 births
1980 deaths
Sportspeople from Turku
Finnish male middle-distance runners
Olympic athletes of Finland
Athletes (track and field) at the 1928 Summer Olympics
Athletes (track and field) at the 1932 Summer Olympics
Medalists at the 1928 Summer Olympics
Olympic gold medalists for Finland
Olympic gold medalists in athletics (track and field)